Alfred A. Hart (1816–1908) was a 19th-century American photographer for the Central Pacific Railroad.  Hart was the official photographer of the western half of the first transcontinental railroad, for which he took 364 historic stereoviews of the railroad construction in the 1860s.  Hart sold his negatives to Carleton Watkins, who continued to publish the CPRR stereoviews in the 1870s.

Bibliography

External links
Alfred A. Hart - 19th Century Photographer of the Central Pacific Railroad Central Pacific Railroad Photographic History Museum
The First Transcontinental Railroad - Alfred A. Hart photos, Stanford University Libraries
Alfred A. Hart Photo Collection, University of Nevada, Reno Library
Guide to the Alfred A. Hart Photograph collection, 1862-1869 at The Bancroft Library
Alfred A. Hart's Stereoscopic Views of the Central Pacific Railroad, 1863-1869

Photographers from Connecticut
American people in rail transportation
Rail transport photographers
1816 births
1908 deaths
19th-century American photographers